The Torkelsons is an American sitcom television series which aired on the NBC television network from September 21, 1991, to June 6, 1993.  Produced by Walt Disney Television in season 1 and Touchstone Television in season 2, the series starred Connie Ray, Olivia Burnette, and William Schallert. For the second and final season, the series was retooled and renamed Almost Home. The series lasted a total of two seasons, consisting of 33 episodes.

Synopsis
Living in Pyramid Corners, a community near Vinita, Oklahoma, Millicent Torkelson (Connie Ray) did what she could to survive financially after her husband Randy (Gregg Henry) left the family. Randy later returned and was seen in 2 episodes, and the couple ended up divorcing. The pilot episode deals with Millicent being so far in debt that she even has her home appliances repossessed. To support her family, Millicent gets a boarder named Wesley Hodges (William Schallert) who ends up living with them for the year in the house basement.

Millicent's children were 14-year-old Dorothy Jane (Olivia Burnette), sweet and exceptionally articulate for her age, who also served running commentary throughout the show by having talks with the "Man in the Moon" by her bedroom window; 12-year-old Steven Floyd (Aaron Michael Metchik), the athletic second-oldest; 10-year-old Ruth Ann (Anna Slotky), who was musically inclined; 8-year-old Chuckie Lee (Lee Norris), the bug collector, always recognizable with his thick-rimmed glasses; and the youngest, 6-year-old Mary Sue (Rachel Duncan), who acted as if nothing was ever wrong. In the first episode, Dorothy Jane meets 18-year-old new neighbor Riley Roberts (Michael Landes) for the first time and becomes infatuated with him. Throughout the first season Riley remains oblivious to this, mainly because of her being a high-school freshman while he was a senior, but they do develop a strong connection. Meanwhile, pesky but well-meaning Kirby Scroggins, a plaid-clad nerd, was forever chasing an uninterested Dorothy Jane. Although her family embarrasses her, Dorothy never let anyone else make fun of them. The pilot also featured Ernie Lively as Jacob "J.W." Presley, a butcher who is smitten with Millicent. In the pilot episode, Benj Thall and Elizabeth Poyer played Steven Floyd and Ruth Ann Torkelson. All these actors were originally to be permanent parts of the show so were credited in the pilot's opening sequence, but the children were subsequently recast, and the character of J.W. was dropped entirely.

Almost Home
After ending its first season on June 16, 1992, the series was retooled and renamed Almost Home. Premiering on February 6, 1993, the second incarnation features the Torkelsons relocating to Seattle after Millicent accepts a job as a nanny, following the foreclosure of the Torkelson family home. In this series, Steven Floyd and Ruth Ann were now considered to have never existed as Millicent refers to Chuckie Lee in Almost Home as her only son and Chuckie Lee refers to himself as the middle child. Millicent took the remaining three children to live with Brian Morgan (Perry King) and his two kids; Gregory (Jason Marsden) and Molly (Brittany Murphy). Brian ran a successful clothing catalog/magazine titled Molly Gregory, a business started by his late wife and named after both their children.

There was some initial resistance from Molly and Gregory to warm up to the Torkelson clan moving in, as they felt somewhat alienated by their down-home ways and devotion to cheerful southern hospitality. Slowly but surely they adjusted, with Gregory becoming a trusted ally to all the kids, and Molly helping Dorothy Jane to fit into her world of shallow, status-conscious people, albeit feebly. Brian and Millicent often clashed over parenting methods, but would usually learn a valuable lesson from each other in the end. The novel practice of having Dorothy Jane talk to the "Man in the Moon" about her issues and dreams from her bedroom window remained. This incarnation of the show ended on June 6, 1993.

With the retooling of the show's format and the title change, the revamped Almost Home also transitioned from being shot on film to being recorded on videotape.

Cast

Main
 Connie Ray as Millicent Torkelson
 Olivia Burnette as Dorothy Jane Torkelson, Millicent's daughter
 Elizabeth Poyer (pilot) & Anna Slotky as Ruth Ann Torkelson, Millicent's daughter (season 1)
 Benj Thall (pilot) & Aaron Michael Metchik as Steven Floyd Torkelson, Millicent's son (season 1)
 Lee Norris as Chuckie Lee Torkelson, Millicent's son
 Rachel Duncan as Mary Sue Torkelson, Millicent's daughter
 Ernie Lively (pilot) as Jacob Presley (season 1)
 William Schallert as Wesley Hodges (season 1)
 Brittany Murphy as Molly Morgan, Brian's daughter (season 2)
 Jason Marsden as Gregory Morgan, Brian's son (season 2)
 Perry King as Brian Morgan (season 2)

Recurring
 Paige Gosney as Kirby Scroggins (season 1)
 Michael Landes as Riley Roberts (season 1)
 Ronnie Claire Edwards as Bootsie Torkelson (season 1)
 Alyson Kiperman as Dreama (season 1)
 Mother Love as Kitty Drysdale (season 1)
 Peter Van Norden as Mel (season 2)
Alyson Hannigan as Samantha (season 2)

Notable guest stars
Drew Carey in the season 1 episode "Say Uncle" (his first appearance in a TV sitcom)
Patty Duke in the season 1 episode "Return to Sender" (reuniting with William Schallert, who played her father in The Patty Duke Show)
Kevin Clash as Elmo in the season 1 episode "Educating Millicent"
Joey Lawrence as Dorothy Jane and Molly's boss in the season 2 episode "Girls and Boy"
Erin Gray in the season 2 episode "Sleeping with the Enemy" as Mr. Morgan's love interest
Ben Affleck in the season 2 episode "Is That All There Is?" as a basketball player who falls in love with Dorothy Jane
Jared Leto in the season 2 episode "The Fox and the Hound" as a football player at a party that Molly throws, whom Dorothy Jane thinks is cute
Donal Logue in the season 2 episode "Hot Ticket" as a musician named "Tommy Tom"

Production notes
Series creator Lynn Montgomery claims to have gotten the name "Torkelson" from a real-life Steven Floyd Torkelson, who had showed her his bug collection, and shared his first kiss with her thirty years earlier.

Episodes

Series overview

Season 1 (1991–92)

Season 2 (1993)

Syndication
The Disney Channel aired reruns of The Torkelsons and Almost Home on their weekday and weekend lineups from January 1994 to late 1999. All Disney Channel advertising for the shows packaged both seasons under The Torkelsons name; however, when the Almost Home episodes aired in circulation, the title was never altered in the opening credits. The Disney Channel also aired the series' episodes in production order.

Accolades

References

External links
 
 
 

1990s American sitcoms
1991 American television series debuts
1993 American television series endings
English-language television shows
Fictional families
NBC original programming
Television series by Disney
Television shows set in Oklahoma
Television shows set in Seattle
Television series about families
Television series by ABC Studios